Tightrope! is an American crime drama series that aired on CBS from September 1959 to September 1960, under the alternating sponsorship of the J.B. Williams Company (Aqua Velva, Lectric Shave, etc.), and American Tobacco (Pall Mall). Produced by Russell Rouse and Clarence Greene in association with Screen Gems, the series stars Mike Connors as an undercover agent named "Nick" who was assigned to infiltrate criminal gangs. The show was originally to have been titled Undercover Man, but it was changed before going to air. Actor Robert Phillips, a former Los Angeles undercover policeman and US Marine claimed the show was based on his exploits, but that he was not chosen to portray himself.

Synopsis
Mike Connors' character narrated the episode, echoing film noir technique. He starred as an undercover police officer, known only as "Nick" (although some sources revealed that his last name was "Stone", his last name was never shown in the series' ending credits). Only his immediate superior on the police force knew he was working undercover. Because the police often did not know that Nick was working for the law, he was often in danger from both the good guys and the bad guys, as he walked the "tightrope" between good and evil. A special gimmick was that in addition to a gun in a shoulder holster, he carried a second gun, a snubnosed revolver, in a holster behind his back; he was often searched by both cops and bad guys, but they stopped searching after finding the first gun.

Episodes

Guest stars

Rico Alaniz
Jack Albertson
Raymond Bailey
Barbara Bain
Whit Bissell
Madge Blake
Whitney Blake
Neville Brand
Paul Burke
Jean Byron
Anthony Caruso
Mary Castle
Russ Conway
Ellen Corby
Jerome Cowan
Walter Coy
Dennis Cross
Donna Douglas
Jack Elam
Ross Elliott
Douglas Fowley
Bruce Gordon
Dabbs Greer
Ron Hagerthy

Myron Healey
Connie Hines
Richard Jaeckel
L.Q. Jones
Brett King
John Larch
Ruta Lee
Barton MacLane
John Marley
Ann McCrea
Ed Nelson
Simon Oakland
John M. Pickard
Stuart Randall
Mike Road
Madlyn Rhue
Doris Singleton
Olan Soule
Karl Swenson
William Tannen
Kent Taylor
George Tobias
Jesse White

Cancellation
Despite the show's popularity, it was canceled after only one season. Mike Connors stated in an interview that the show's primary sponsor (J.B. Williams) refused the network's request to move it to a later timeslot on a different day. When CBS head James Aubrey stated that the show was indisputably going to move timeslot, the sponsor dropped Tightrope!, and underwrote another program on another network. Connors also did not agree with suggested changes to the show's format, that would have extended its length to one hour and added a sidekick, to be played by Don Sullivan. He thought such an alteration would eliminate the suspense element of the program. Yet another factor in the show's eventual cancellation were complaints concerning its alleged excessive violence.

Seven years later, Connors would go on to star in the successful, long-running CBS crime series Mannix.

References

External links
 
 

1959 American television series debuts
1960 American television series endings
1950s American crime drama television series
1960s American crime drama television series
Black-and-white American television shows
CBS original programming
English-language television shows
Television series by Sony Pictures Television
Television series by Screen Gems